Halfway to Nowhere is a 1972 Australian TV play based on the novel by Norman Lindsay. It was part of a series of five Lindsay adaptations on the ABC.

Premise
Bill and Waldo, 16-year-old school boys, experiment with alcohol and women.

Cast 
Alan Wilson as Bill Gimble
 Geoff Boon as Waldo Peddler
 Rosalie Fletcher as Polly Tanner
 Sally Cahill as Gertie Sparks.

References

External links 
 
 Halfway to Nowhere at AustLit
 Copy of complete script at National Archives of Australia

Australian television plays
Films directed by David Cahill
Films based on works by Norman Lindsay